ICPEAC, the International Conference on Photonic, Electronic and Atomic Collisions, is a biennial scientific conference. It is held in late July. The first conference was held in New York City in 1958. Since then it has been held in the following locations:

References

Physics conferences